Aldis Alexander Basil Hodge (born September 20, 1986) is an American actor. Among his significant roles, he played Alec Hardison in the TNT series Leverage, MC Ren in the 2015 biopic Straight Outta Compton, Levi Jackson in the 2016 film Hidden Figures, Noah in the WGN America series Underground, Matthew in Girlfriends and Jim Brown in the 2020 film One Night in Miami.... He portrays Carter Hall / Hawkman in the DC Extended Universe, starting with Black Adam (2022).

Life and career
Hodge was born on September 20, 1986, in Onslow County, North Carolina. Both of his parents, Aldis Basil Hodge and Yolette Evangeline Richardson, served in the U.S. Marine Corps. Hodge's mother is from Florida, while his father is originally from Dominica. Aldis is the younger brother of actor Edwin Hodge. Hodge played both the clarinet and the violin as a child, but as an adult, his focus is on the violin; he purchased his first at the age of 18. In addition to acting, Hodge designs watches, writes, and paints. In 2007, Hodge was awarded the role of Alec Hardison in the TNT series Leverage on the day of his 21st birthday. In 2009, he received a Saturn Award nomination for Best Supporting Actor on Television for this role.

In 2019, he began his role as Decourcy Ward in Showtime's City on a Hill with Kevin Bacon. In 2020, it was confirmed that Hodge will play the role of Carter Hall / Hawkman in the Jaume Collet-Serra's DCEU 2022 film Black Adam alongside Dwayne Johnson, Noah Centineo, Sarah Shahi and Pierce Brosnan. In October 2022 it was announced that he would play the lead role of Alex Cross in the Amazon Prime Video streaming series Cross based on the James Patterson series of novels.

Filmography

Films

Television

Video games

Other work

Awards and nominations

References

External links

 

1986 births
20th-century American male actors
21st-century American male actors
African-American male actors
African-American male child actors
American male child actors
American male film actors
American male television actors
American people of Dominica descent
People from Onslow County, North Carolina
Living people
Male actors from North Carolina
Outstanding Performance by a Cast in a Motion Picture Screen Actors Guild Award winners
20th-century African-American people
21st-century African-American people
Black Adam Movie Explain